Albino Z. SyCip (last name also spelled as Sycip) (c. 1888May 2, 1978) was a Chinese Filipino financier of Fujianese origin.  He was known as the "Dean of Philippine Banking".  He earned his law degree from the University of Michigan School of Law in Ann Arbor, Michigan.

The son of immigrants from Fujian province, China, SyCip co-founded Chinabank, establishing branches in Amoy and Shanghai, China. He was also one of the original incorporators of the Philippine Rural Reconstruction Movement.

His sons were:
 David SyCip - businessman
 Washington SyCip - founder of SyCip Gorres Velayo & Co., one of the largest accounting firms in Asia.
 Alexander SyCip - founder of SyCip Salazar Hernandez & Gatmaitan, the largest and leading law firm in the Philippines.

References

External links
 Don Albino, The Elder SyCip, A Profile of a Filipino-Chinese
 Biography of Washington SyCip

1880s births
1978 deaths
Filipino bankers
University of Michigan Law School alumni
Filipino people of Chinese descent
Place of birth missing